The year 1977 was the 6th year after the independence of Bangladesh. It was also the first year of the Government of Ziaur Rahman. In this year while the new President had to deal with a number of mutiny and overthrow attempts, he also managed to consolidate his power through a referendum, and promoted a nineteen-point political and economic program focusing on population control, food security, education and rural development.

Incumbents

 President: Abu Sadat Mohammad Sayem (until 21 April), Ziaur Rahman (starting 21 April)
 Chief Justice: Syed A. B. Mahmud Hossain

Demography

Climate

Economy

Note: For the year 1977 average official exchange rate for BDT was 15.38 per US$.

Events

 21 April: Zia replaces Sayem as the President.
 30 May: Zia wins 98.9 percent of votes in referendum on his continuance as president.
 3 June: Supreme Court justice Abdus Sattar becomes vice president.
 1 September: Formation of Bangladesh Nationalist Party (BNP).
 28 September: A Japan Airlines Flight 472 en route from Mumbai to Tokyo was hijacked by 5 Japanese Red Army terrorists shortly after takeoff, and forced the plane to land at then Zia International Airport. The terrorists' demand of $6 million and release of 6 JRA terrorists from Japanese prison was met by the Japanese Prime Minister. Bangladesh Air Force was deployed to control the situation in the ground and to facilitate negotiations.
 30 September: A mutiny breaks out in Bogra.
 2 October: The mutiny is quelled, but is followed by another failed attempt to overthrow Zia in Dhaka.
 A five-year treaty is signed with India on water sharing.
 Bangladesh became an Associate member of the International Cricket Council.

Awards and Recognitions

Independence Day Award

Ekushey Padak
 Mohammad Nasiruddin (literature)
 Ustad Gul Mohammad Khan (music)
 Ibrahim Khan (education)
 Mahmuda Khatun Siddiqua (literature)
 Khondakar Abdul Hamid (journalism)
 Ayub Ali (education)
 Shamsur Rahman (literature)
 Zahir Raihan (drama)
 Rashid Choudhury (fine arts)
 Abdul Alim (music)
 Altaf Mahmud (music)
 Ferdausi Rahman (music)
 Farrukh Ahmad (literature)

Sports
 Domestic football: Abahani KC won Dhaka League title, while Rahmatganj MFS came out runners-up.

Births
 GMB Akash, photographer
 Mohammad Rakibul Hasan, photographer
 Amin Khan, actor
 Zulfiker Mahmud Mintu, footballer
 Zulfiqer Russell, lyricist

Deaths
 13 February: Abdus Salam, editor. (b. 1910)
 2 May: Mahmuda Khatun Siddiqua, writer. (b. 1906)
 2 September: Theotonius Amal Ganguly, Archbishop. (b. 1920)
 24 October: Hatem Ali Khan, politician. (b. 1904)
 3 November: Muhammad Qudrat-i-Khuda, scientist. (b. 1900)
 11 November: ARM Inamul Haque, social worker. (b. 1921)

See also
 1970s in Bangladesh
 List of Bangladeshi films of 1977

References

 
Bangladesh
Bangladesh